I Believe in Love may refer to:

 "I Believe in Love" (Bonnie Guitar song), a 1968 song written by Boudleaux Bryant and recorded by American country artist, Bonnie Guitar
 "I Believe in Love" (Kenny Loggins song), a 1976 song written by Kenny Loggins and Alan and Marilyn Bergman and introduced by Barbra Streisand in A Star Is Born
 "Love Action (I Believe in Love)", a 1981 song by the British synthpop group The Human League
 "I Believe (In Love)", a 1970 song by the band Hot Chocolate
 "I Believe in Love", a song from the 2001 Carola Häggkvist album, My Show
 "I Believe in Love", a song written in 1970 and recorded for the soundtrack of the 2012 film, Mirror Mirror

See also
"I Don't Believe in Love", a 1988 a song by progressive metal band Queensrÿche
"I Believe in a Thing Called Love", a 2003 song by English rock band The Darkness
"I Still Believe in Love", a 1968 single by American country music artist Jan Howard
"Don't Believe in Love", a 2008 pop song performed by Dido
Believe in Love (disambiguation)
I Believe (disambiguation)